Bilge Qaghan (683 – 25 November 734) was the fourth Qaghan of the Second Turkic Khaganate. His accomplishments were described in the Orkhon inscriptions.

Names
As was the custom, his personal name and the name after assuming the title Qaghan were different. His name after assuming the title was Bilgä Qaγan..

Early years 
He was born in 683, in the early years of the khaganate. He campaigned alongside his father from early childhood. He was created as Tardush shad and given command over the western wing of the empire in 697 by Qapaghan. He managed to annihilate Wei Yuanzhong's army in 701 with his brother. He also reconquered Basmyl tribes in 703. He also subdued Yenisei Kyrgyz forces in 709, after their disobedience had to reconquer and kill their Qaghan in 710. He killed Türgesh khagan Suoge at Battle of Bolchu.

In later years of Qapaghan, he had to fight four battles in a year starting from 714, resubduing tribes and nearly was killed in an ambush from Uyghur forces in 716.

Reign

In 716, Qapaghan Qaghan, the second Qaghan, was killed in his campaign against the Toquz Oghuz alliance and his severed head was sent to Chang'an. Although his son Inel Khagan succeeded him, Bilgä's brother Kul Tigin and Tonyukuk carried out a coup d'état against Inel Qaghan. They killed him and made him Bilgä Qaghan. His name literally means "wise king".

He appointed his brother Kul Tigin to be Left Wise Prince, which made second most powerful person in realm. He re-subdued Huige in 716. He also appointed his father-in-law Tonyukuk to be Master Strategist.

New reforms and stabilization of the regime, caused tribes that fled Tujue to come back. Tang chancellor Wang Jun, believing that the Göktürks who surrendered would try to flee back to the Göktürk state, suggested that they be forcibly moved into the heart of the empire to prevent them from doing so. Before Wang's suggestion could be acted upon, however, there was an uprising by the Göktürks who surrendered, under the leadership of Xiedie Sitai (𨁂跌思泰) and Axilan (阿悉爛). Xue and Wang tried to intercept them and dealt them defeats, but they were able to flee back to the Göktürk state anyway. This defeat led to Xue Ne's retirement.

Religious policy 
At some point in his life, he thought about converting to Buddhism and settling in cities. However, Tonyukuk discouraged him from this, citing the Turks' few numbers and vulnerability to Chinese attacks. While the Turks' power rested on their mobility, conversion to Buddhism would bring pacifism among the population. Therefore, sticking to Tengrism was necessary for survival.

Later reign 

In 720, Wang believed that the Pugu (僕固) and Xiedie tribes of the region were planning to defect to Eastern Tujue and attack with Eastern Tujue troops. He thus held a feast and invited the chieftains, and, at the feast, massacred them. He then attacked the Pugu and Xiedie tribes in the area, nearly wiping them out. He then proposed a plan to attack Qaghan along with the Baximi, Xi, and Khitan. Emperor Xuanzong also recruited Qapaghan Khagan's sons Bilgä Tigin and Mo Tigin, Yenisei Kyrgyz Qaghan Kutluk Bilgä Qaghan and Huoba Guiren to fight against Tujue. Tonyukuk cunningly launched first attack on Baximi in 721 autumn, completely crushing them. Meanwhile, Bilgä raided Gansu, taking much of the livestock. Later that year Khitans, next year Xi were also crushed.

In 726, his father-in-law and chancellor Tonyukuk died.

In 727, he sent Buyruk Chor as en emissary to Xuanzong to send 30 horses as gift. He also alarmed him of Me Agtsom's proposal of anti-Tang alliance. This alarm proved to be true when Tibetan general We Tadra Khonglo invaded Tang China in 727, sack Guazhou (瓜州, in mordern Gansu), Changle (常樂, in south of mordern Guazhou County), Changmenjun (長門軍, in north of mordern Yumen) and Anxi (安西, mordern Lintan).

On 27 February 731, Kul Tigin died, for which Qaghan mourned and ordered a great funeral ceremony.

In 733, he defeated rebellious Khitan tribes.

Death 
Just after sending an emissary to Xuanzong to gain heqin alliance, he was poisoned by Buyruk Chor. He did not die immediately and he had time to punish the family of Buyruk Chor with death. He died on 25 November 734, his burial ceremony took place on 22 June 735.

Family 
He was married to El Etmish Bilge Khatun, Tonyukuk's daughter. He had several children:

 Ashina Yiran (阿史那伊然)
 Ashina Kutluk (阿史那骨咄)
 2 unnamed sons who both became puppet Qaghans under Kutluk Yabgu Khagan
 A daughter who was married to Suluk
 Po Beg - submitted to Tang after 744.

Legacy 
After his death from poisoning, several steles were erected in the capital area by the Orkhon River. These Orkhon inscriptions are the first known texts in the Old Turkic language.

In popular culture 
 Bilge Qaghan is portrayed by Kang Jae-ik in the 2006-2007 KBS TV series Dae Jo Yeong.

See also
 Silver Deer of Bilge Khan

References

Sources
 Encyclopædia Britannica, Micropaedia, Vol. II, pp. 16–17

External links
Bilge Kagan Inscriptions complete text
The National Museum of Mongolian History: The early Turk Empire and the Uighurs

 
 

680s births
734 deaths
Deaths by poisoning
Göktürk khagans
Ashina house of the Turkic Empire
8th-century Turkic people
Leaders who took power by coup
Tengrist monarchs